This is a list of androgens/anabolic steroids (AAS) or testosterone derivatives. Esters are mostly not included in this list; for esters, see here instead. The major classes of testosterone derivatives include the following (as well as combinations thereof):

 Testosterone derivatives: immediate derivatives of testosterone not falling into the groups below
 4,5α-Reduced/dihydrogenated testosterone derivatives: dihydrotestosterone (DHT) derivatives
 19-Demethylated testosterone derivatives: 19-nortestosterone (nandrolone) derivatives
 17α-Alkylated testosterone derivatives: methyltestosterone and ethyltestosterone derivatives
 17α-Ethenylated/ethynylated testosterone derivatives: ethynyltestosterone (ethisterone) and vinyltestosterone derivatives

The last group consists of progestins with mostly only very weak androgenic/anabolic activity.

AAS that are listed as marketed may be marketed as one or more esters rather than as the listed AAS itself.

This list specifically pertains to steroidal androgens; nonsteroidal androgens like the selective androgen receptor modulators (SARMs) andarine and enobosarm (ostarine) are not included here.

Natural/endogenous
 Marketed
 Androstenediol (A5; 5-androstenediol)
 Boldenone (δ1-T)*
 Dehydroepiandrosterone (DHEA; prasterone, 5-androstenolone)
 Dihydrotestosterone (DHT; androstanolone, stanolone)
 Nandrolone (19-NT; 19-nortestosterone)*
 Testosterone (T; 4-androstenolone)
 Never marketed
 11-Ketodihydrotestosterone (11-KDHT)
 11-Ketotestosterone (11-KT)
 11β-Hydroxyandrostenedione (11β-OHA4)
 19-Nor-5-androstenediol (19-NA5)*
 Adrenosterone (11-ketoandrostenedione; 11-KA4)
 Androstenedione (A4; 4-androstenedione)
 Androsterone
 Bolandione (19-nor-4-androstenedione)*
 Dehydroandrosterone (DHA; 5-dehydroandrosterone)
 Epiandrosterone

* Only present endogenously in trace/very small amounts or present in other species.

Synthetic

Testosterone derivatives

 Non-17α-alkylated derivatives
 Marketed
 Clostebol (4-chloro-T)
 Cloxotestosterone (T 17-chloral hemiacetal ether)
 Quinbolone (δ1-T 17β-cyclopentenyl enol ether)
 Never marketed
 4-Hydroxytestosterone (4-hydroxy-T)
 Boldione (δ1-4-androstenedione)
 Silandrone (T 17β-trimethylsilyl ether)

 17α-Alkylated derivatives
 Marketed
 Bolasterone (7α,17α-dimethyl-T)
 Calusterone (7β,17α-dimethyl-T)
 Chlorodehydromethyltestosterone (CDMT; 4-chloro-17α-methyl-δ1-T)
 Fluoxymesterone (9α-fluoro-11β-hydroxy-17α-methyl-T)
 Formebolone (2-formyl-11α-hydroxy-17α-methyl-δ1-T)
 Metandienone (methandrostenolone; 17α-methyl-δ1-T)
 Methandriol (methylandrostenediol; 17α-methyl-5-androstenediol)
 Methyltestosterone (17α-methyl-T)
 Methyltestosterone 3-hexyl ether (17α-methyl-T 3-hexyl ether)
 Oxymesterone (4-hydroxy-17α-methyl-T)
 Penmesterol (17α-methyl-T 3-cyclopentyl ether)
 Tiomesterone (1α,7α-diacetylthio-17α-methyl-T)
 Never marketed
 Chlorodehydromethylandrostenediol (CDMA; 4-chloro-17α-methyl-δ1-4-androstenediol)
 Chloromethylandrostenediol (CMA; 4-chloro-17α-methyl-4-androstenediol)
 Enestebol (4-hydroxy-17α-methyl-δ1-T)
 Ethyltestosterone (17α-ethyl-T)
 Hydroxystenozole (a pyrazole A ring-fused derivative of δ2-T)
 Methylclostebol (4-chloro-17α-methyl-T)

Dihydrotestosterone derivatives

 Non-17α-alkylated derivatives
 Marketed
 Bolazine (an azine dimer prodrug of drostanolone)
 Drostanolone (2α-methyl-DHT)
 Epitiostanol (2α,3α-epithio-DHT)
 Mepitiostane (a 17-ether prodrug of epitiostanol)
 Mesterolone (1α-methyl-DHT)
 Metenolone (1-methyl-δ1-DHT)
 Stenbolone (2-methyl-δ1-DHT)
 Never marketed
 1-Testosterone (dihydroboldenone; δ1-DHT)
 Mesabolone (a 17-ether prodrug of δ1-DHT)
 Prostanozol (a 17-ether prodrug of 17α-demethylstanozolol)

 17α-Alkylated derivatives
 Marketed
 Androisoxazole (an isoxazole A ring-fused derivative of 17α-methyl-DHT)
 Furazabol (a furan A ring-fused derivative of 17α-methyl-DHT)
 Mebolazine (an azine dimer prodrug of methasterone)
 Mestanolone (17α-methyl-DHT)
 Oxandrolone (2-oxa-17α-methyl-DHT)
 Oxymetholone (2-hydroxymethylene-17α-methyl-DHT)
 Stanozolol (a pyrazole A ring-fused derivative of 17α-methyl-DHT)
 Never marketed
 Desoxymethyltestosterone (3-deketo-17α-methyl-δ2-DHT)
 Methasterone (2α,17α-dimethyl-DHT)
 Methyl-1-testosterone (methyldihydroboldenone; 17α-methyl-δ1-DHT)
 Methylepitiostanol (2α,3α-epithio-17α-methyl-DHT)
 Methylstenbolone (2,17α-dimethyl-δ1-DHT)

19-Nortestosterone derivatives

 Non-17α-alkylated derivatives
 Marketed
 Bolandiol (19-nor-4-androstenediol)
 Norclostebol (4-chloro-19-NT)
 Oxabolone (4-hydroxy-19-NT)
 Trenbolone (δ9,11-19-NT)
 Never marketed
 7α-Methyl-19-nor-4-androstenedione (MENT dione, trestione)
 11β-Methyl-19-nortestosterone (11β-MNT; 11β-methyl-19-NT)
 19-Nor-5-androstenedione
 19-Nor-5-dehydroepiandrosterone (19-nor-DHEA)
 Bolmantalate (nandrolone adamantoate; 19-NT)
 Dienedione (δ9-19-nor-4-androstenedione)
 Dienolone (δ9-19-NT 17β-adamantoate)
 Dimethandrolone (7α,11β-dimethyl-19-NT)
 Methoxydienone (18-methyl-δ2,5(10)- 3β-methyl ether)
 Trendione (δ9,11-19-nor-4-androstenedione)
 Trestolone (MENT; 7α-methyl-19-NT)

 17α-Alkylated derivatives
 Marketed
 Ethylestrenol (ethylnandrol; 3-deketo-17α-ethyl-19-NT)
 Mibolerone (7α,17α-dimethyl-19-NT)
 Norethandrolone (17α-ethyl-19-NT)
 Normethandrone (methylestrenolone; 17α-methyl-19-NT)
 Propetandrol (17α-ethyl-19-NT 3β-propionate)
 Never marketed
 Bolenol (3-deketo-17α-ethyl-19-nor-5-androstenediol)
 Dimethyltrienolone (7α,17α-dimethyl-δ9,11-19-NT)
 Ethyldienolone (17α-ethyl-δ9-19-NT)
 Methyldienolone (17α-ethyl-δ9-19-NT)
 Methylhydroxynandrolone (MOHN, MHN; 4-hydroxy-17α-methyl-19-NT)
 Metribolone (methyltrienolone, R-1881; 17α-methyl-δ9,11-19-NT)
 Norboletone (17α-ethyl-18-methyl-19-NT)
 RU-2309 (18-methylmetribolone, 17α-methyl-THG)
 Tetrahydrogestrinone (THG; 17α-ethyl-18-methyl-δ9,11-19-NT)

Other testosterone derivatives

 17α-Alkenylated derivatives
 Marketed
 Norvinisterone (vinylnortestosterone; 17α-ethenyl-19-NT)
 Never marketed
 Vinyltestosterone (17α-ethenyl-T)

 17α-Alkynylated derivatives
 Marketed
 Danazol (an isoxazole A ring-fused derivative of 17α-ethynyl-T)
 Ethisterone (17α-ethynyl-T)
 Gestrinone (17α-ethynyl-18-methyl-δ9,11-19-NT)
 Norgestrienone (17α-ethynyl-δ9,11-19-NT)
 Tibolone (7α-methyl-17α-ethynyl-δ5(10)-19-NT)

See also
 List of steroids
 List of designer drugs § Androgens
 List of androgens/anabolic steroids available in the United States

References

Further reading
 
 
 

Androgens and anabolic steroids
Steroids
Androgens anabolic steroids (alternate)